The Ramaiya are a caste found in the state of Uttar Pradesh in India. Many members of this community migrated to Pakistan in 1947 and have settled in Punjab.

History and origin

The Ramaiya are a community that are partly Sikh, and partly Muslim. They get their name from the [[word Ramay, which means to Archer. The community acquired this name on account of the fact that they were Farmers, and are said to have belonged to the Bhatra community, a well known Sikh caste of Punjab. Like the Bhatra, they are said to be Kshatriyas. They migrated into Uttar Pradesh in the 17th and 18th Century. The community were originally Sikh, and said to have come from Punjab. However long residence in Uttar Pradesh has meant that Ramaiya are more properly Nanakshahi, rather than Sikh. A significant number of Ramaiya in the Rohilkhand region have converted to Islam. The Nanakshahi are sub-divided into a number of exogamous clans, known as gotras. Their main gotras are the Bamra, Bank, Barsari, Bhat, Bisati, Dargal, Gajra, Gaur, Gujjar, Hardoiri, Nomain, Radi, Rai, Ranipari, Rathore, Sinha and Sipmatua. While the Muslim branch consists of the following divisions, the Rajput and Ramay.

Present circumstances 

The community were traditionally salesman and village shop keepers. Many are now successful businessmen. They are found mainly in western Uttar Pradesh in the districts of Saharanpur, Bijnor, Moradabad and Jyotiba Phule Nagar. Their main settlements in Bagpat. In Saharanpur District, their main settlement is Chilkhana. Like other North Indian Hindu communities, they maintain strict clan exogamy. While the Muslim section prefers marrying close kin, and practice both parallel cousin and cross cousin marriages. Many Nanakshahi Ramaiya are now orthodox Hindu.

See also
 Bhatra

References

Social groups of Uttar Pradesh
Muslim communities of India
Shaikh clans
Muslim communities of Uttar Pradesh
Sikh communities